is a railway station on the Aonami Line in Nakagawa-ku, Nagoya, Japan, operated by the third sector railway operator Nagoya Rinkai Rapid Transit.

Lines

Station layout
The station consists of one elevated island platform serving two tracks.

Platforms

Adjacent stations

History 
The station opened on 6 October 2004 as one of the stations constructed along the Aonami Line connecting Nagoya city centre to the Kinjō-futō Station at Nagoya Port.

References

Railway stations in Nagoya
Railway stations opened in 2004
2004 establishments in Japan